The 1960–61 South-West Indian Ocean cyclone season was one of the least active South-West Indian Ocean cyclone seasons on record. It only had 6 tropical depressions, 5 named storms, 4 tropical storms, and 1 cyclone, Doris. Additionally, none of its storms made landfall, therefore it had almost no deaths or damage. The season was also the second with named storms, the first being 1959–60.

Systems

Tropical Storm Anna

Anna existed from November 11 to November 14. Its peak intensity was 65 kilometers an hour, or 40 miles per hour, in 1-minute maximum sustained winds.

Unnamed tropical depression
A tropical depression briefly existed in the northeast portion of the basin from November 29–30. Its peak intensity is currently unknown.

Tropical Storm Barbara

Barbara existed from November 27 to December 3. In 1-minute maximum sustained winds, its peak intensity was 85 miles per hour. That is equal to 50 kilometers per hour. For its whole duration, it stayed away from land.

Tropical Storm Clara

Clara, a slow-moving tropical cyclone, lasted from January 1 to January 6 and, twice, nearly made landfall. On New Year's Day, it formed near Madagascar. Moving west-northwestward, Clara reached its peak intensity of 85 mph (50 km/h). As it dissipated, Clara's remnants drifted over Mozambique.

Cyclone Doris

Cyclone Doris was the only storm of the season to reach cyclone strength. On January 24, 1961, it formed east of Madagascar. A few days later, Doris reached its peak intensity, with 1-minute maximum sustained winds of 90 mph or 150 km/h. Moving southeast, it began to weaken. Doris finally dissipated on February 2, lasting 9 days.

Tropical Depression Eva

On February 7, 1961, the final storm of the season, Eva, formed. However, it soon encountered unfavorable conditions, and dissipated on February 10, 3 days later. Its 1-minute peak intensity was 55 km/h (35 mph).

See also

 Atlantic hurricane seasons: 1960, 1961
 Eastern Pacific hurricane seasons: 1960, 1961
 Western Pacific typhoon seasons: 1960, 1961
 North Indian Ocean cyclone seasons: 1960, 1961
 1960s Australian region cyclone seasons
 1960s South Pacific cyclone seasons

References

South-West Indian Ocean cyclone seasons